Ahakea (Bobea timonioides) is a species of flowering tree in the coffee family, Rubiaceae, that is endemic to Hawaii. It is threatened by habitat loss.

Notes

References
 

Endemic flora of Hawaii
Trees of Hawaii
Bobea
Endangered plants
Taxonomy articles created by Polbot